Petz: Crazy Monkeyz (sometimes called simply Crazy Monkeyz) is a sim game developed and published by Ubisoft and released for the Wii on February 13, 2009.

Gameplay
Crazy Monkeyz is a sim game designed for 1 player and revolving around caring for a monkey.

To start you can choose from two species of monkey (others can be unlocked later), each has three coat types to choose from but you will be unable to see the other two. From there you can feed your monkey, play with it, dress it up, breed it, or turn on the TV for it (plays a non-stop commercial for the game).

Reception

The game has received largely negative reviews. There is little to do in the game besides feeding and dressing up the monkey. Balls and other toys will fall through the monkeys hands and in the backyard area of the game you cannot interact with your monkey. Also, in the adoption center when you go to choose your monkey, you get the choice to choose a color, but it does not tell you what you are choosing.

References

External links
Petz Monkeyz for wii
Petz Monkeyz Review

Ubisoft games
Wii games
Virtual pet video games